The Welden Brothers, also known as Welden Brothers Construction Company, was a firm based in Iowa Falls, Iowa that built bridges throughout the midwest.

The  Iowa Falls Bridge, built by the firm in 1928, was then the longest arch span in the state of Iowa.

A number of the firm's works are listed on the National Register of Historic Places (NRHP).

Works include (with attribution):
Alden Bridge, Main St. over Iowa R. Alden, IA (Welden Brothers), NRHP-listed
Iowa Falls Bridge, US 65 over Iowa R. Iowa Falls, IA (Welden Brothers Construction Co.), NRHP-listed
River Street Bridge, River St. over Iowa R. Iowa Falls, IA (Welden Brothers), NRHP-listed
Washington Avenue Bridge, US 20 over Iowa R. Iowa Falls, IA (Welden Brothers), NRHP-listed

References

Bridge companies
Companies based in Iowa
Construction and civil engineering companies of the United States
1928 establishments in Iowa
Construction and civil engineering companies established in 1928
American companies established in 1928